Daniel Millican (born June 6, 1965) is an American writer/director in the film industry and YouTube personality.  His most recent film The Imposter, starring Kevin Max of dcTalk was released in 2010.  His previous movie, Striking Range, starring Lou Diamond Phillips, was released in 2006 by Sony Pictures.  Millican's movies have played all around the world, distributed by companies Curb Entertainment, Artist View Entertainment, Sony Pictures, First Look Media and played on television, both cable and free TV like Lifetime Movie Network and Starz/Encore.  Actors like Lou Diamond Phillips, Adam Baldwin, Sean Patrick Flanery, Mimi Rogers, Joey Lauren Adams, Yancy Butler and Tom Wright have starred in Millican's movies.

Biography

Early life 
Millican was born in Austin, Texas and moved up to the Dallas/Fort Worth area before graduating high school.  He began his interest in filmmaking while in junior high, writing skits and stories.  While a junior in high school, Millican helped a college friend with a communications project and fell in love with the industry.  He began writing scripts almost immediately.  Millican attended three different high schools (Dripping Springs, Austin Anderson, and graduated from Kennedale south of Fort Worth, Texas).

College 
Millican attended and graduated from the University of Texas at Arlington from 1983 to 1989 with a bachelor's degree in communications with a major in Radio/TV and a double minor in English and Drama.  While at UTA, he was a member of Chi Alpha and met his wife Jill in the organization.  He also took film electives and completed several short films.

Career 
After graduating, Millican went to work in broadcasting and video/film production, in both small and large venue. Later Millican would be the General Manager for a production facility, directing and producing. Millican has won over 30 international awards for his writing, directing, editing and producing of films, television, music videos, commercials and corporate films.

Daniel Millican made the leap from Commercials and Music Videos to features in 2000. With his first film The Keyman: Finding Redemption , Millican explored the issues of regret and abandonment on the streets and the destructive power of unforgiveness. That movie starred Adam Baldwin and is being released worldwide by Artistview Entertainment out of LA.  The movie was inspired by a near miss when Millican was a new parent.  When the film was being cast, Millican chose veteran Los Angeles actor Tom Wright to play the role of a homeless man.  Wright has gone on to have a role in every one of Millican's films.

Millican's sophomore project was the film A Promise Kept starring Sean Patrick Flanery, Joey Lauren Adams, Jeff Speakman and Mimi Rogers (The Gunman for US video). This movie asks the question, "Do we take justice into our own hands, even for the most noble causes"? Worldwide sales were strong and the movie was released on video in the summer of 2004. Lifetime Movie Network premiered the film on television in January 2005.  The film was shot in and around Millican's birth city of Austin (even though he lives in the Dallas Fort Worth area) in the winter of 2002 and 2003.

Striking Range is drawn from Millican's experiences working in the corporate environment.  In addition to Lou Diamond Phillips, the movie also stars Yancy Butler, Glenn Moreshower and Jeff Speakman.  The working title of the movie was Bloodlines as Millican had weaved the central plot around a hereditary blood disease, porphyria.  Later, as that plot point was moved back a little, the title was changed to Striking Range.  The movie's central message is one of the devastating effects of narcissism.  The movie opens with a quote from 19th century theologian Charles Finney "the natural state of man is selfishness."  This was from Finney's sermon entitled True and False Conversion.

The Imposter is Millican's fourth film and his first to be targeted for the Christian audience (although Christian themes are woven through all his movies).  The movie's main character, Johnny C, played by Max, is a Christian rock star for a popular band called Grand_design. The plot mirrors the prodigal son story from the Bible with a few significant twists.  The Imposter was released by PureFlix Entertainment in February 2010.

"Rising Stars" is the fifth film by Millican and stars Barry Corbin, Catherine Mary Stewart, Christian recording star Rebecca St. James and Fisher Stevens.  The story centers on a group of older teens who are trying to make it big in film and music.

Millican has been compared to fellow Austin-native Robert Rodriguez-as far as the technical areas. Like Rodriguez, Millican writes, directs, produces and edits his own features and even occasionally composes and performs the musical score.

Millican in 2018 founded the Taking Off YouTube channel focusing on general aviation news, rambles and a show InTheHanger. He flies a Cessna 210.

Personal life 
Millican lives with wife Jill, his two children.

External links 
 Official site
 Taking Off YouTube

References 

1965 births
Living people
American male screenwriters
University of Texas at Arlington alumni